"I'm Gonna Knock on Your Door", written by Aaron Schroeder and Sid Wayne, is a song that was originally released by the Isley Brothers in 1959 and became a hit for teenage actor Eddie Hodges in 1961. It peaked at #12 at Billboard Hot 100.

Cover versions
Billy "Crash" Craddock, on his album Two Sides of "Crash", in 1972; it became a big country hit.
Jimmy Osmond, in 1974, reached # 11 on the UK singles chart.
 Former Beatles drummer Pete Best, in the 1960s, with his group, the Pete Best Four.
Singapore-based female singer Ervinna, between 1972 and 1974, with backing music by The Charlie & His Boys, on her album Golden Hits Of 20th Century Vol. 4; this was released on the local White Cloud label.
In Swedish, three lyric versions exist, "Mina kärleksbrev dom vill jag ha igen" ("My love letters, I want them again") written by Åke Gerhard and released in 1961 as recorded by Lill-Babs, "Min lägenhet den vill jag ha igen" ("My flat, I want it again") written by Einar Svensson and released as recorded by Thorleifs on the 1974 album "En dag i juni" and "Två ska man va'" ("Two shall you be"), written by Christer Lundh and released as recorded by Lotta Engberg on the 1988 album 100%.
The Japanese band Tokyo Incidents played it on their 2004–2005 live tour Dynamite!.

Trivia

 It was the first number-one single on Tio i Topp, which is considered the first official record chart in Sweden

The song was used by the Red Cross for a door-knocking donation awareness campaign on TV in Australia in the 1980s. It had been a #1 hit there in 1961.

 An excerpt of "I'm Gonna Knock on Your Door" was used in the Buchanan and Goodman 1961 break-in novelty recording entitled "Berlin Top Ten" which dealt with the Berlin Wall crisis, during the Cold War. Boris the Russian Spinner, introduces the song as "I'm Gonna Knock on your Door" by the Secret Police, but it is interrupted by a breaking news development involving another Cold War issue.

Chart performance

Eddie Hodges

Billy "Crash" Craddock

Jimmy Osmond

References

External links
 
 
 

1959 songs
1959 singles
1961 singles
1972 singles
The Isley Brothers songs
Billy "Crash" Craddock songs
Lotta Engberg songs
Songs written by Aaron Schroeder
Number-one singles in Canada
Songs written by Sid Wayne
Song recordings produced by Ron Chancey
Thorleifs songs
Lill-Babs songs
Cadence Records singles
ABC Records singles